"Honestly" is a power ballad by the American Christian metal band Stryper. The song was the band's fifth single and their highest charting on the Billboard Hot 100. It became one of the most requested songs on MTV. "Honestly" is one of Stryper's best-known songs, peaking at No. 23 on the Billboard Hot 100, and remains as the band's only top 40 hit on that chart.

Track listing 
 "Honestly"
 "Sing-Along Song"
 "Loving You" (Live in Japan)

References

External links 
 
 Lyrics of this song at LyricsFreak

1986 songs
1987 singles
Glam metal ballads
Stryper songs